Saint-Modeste is a municipality situated in the Rivière-du-Loup Regional County Municipality of Quebec, Canada.

See also
 List of municipalities in Quebec

References

External links
 

Municipalities in Quebec
Incorporated places in Bas-Saint-Laurent